Le Bal du comte d'Orgel may refer to:

 Le bal du Comte d'Orgel, a 1924 novel by Raymond Radiguet
 Le Bal du comte d'Orgel (film), a 1970 film directed by Yves Allégret based on the above book